Smith Street Line refers to the following transit lines:
Smith Street Line (surface) in Brooklyn.
IND Smith Street Line in Brooklyn, part of the Culver Line